Anne Dawson may refer to:

 Anne Dawson (broadcaster), English academic and former broadcast journalist
 Anne Dawson (secret agent) (1896–1989), British spy in occupied Belgium in WW1

See also 
 Anna Dawson (born 1937), English actress and singer
 Anne Lagacé Dowson, Canadian radio journalist